This article displays the qualifying draw for men's singles at the 1981 Australian Open.

Seeds

Qualifiers

Qualifying draw

First qualifier

Second qualifier

Third qualifier

Fourth qualifier

Fifth qualifier

Sixth qualifier

Seventh qualifier

Eighth qualifier

External links
 1981 Australian Open – Men's draws and results at the International Tennis Federation

Men's Singles Qualifying
Australian Open (tennis) by year – Qualifying